Galleria Ice Rink is an indoor ice skating and ice hockey rink located within the Galleria Ataköy shopping center located in Bakırköy district of Istanbul, Turkey. It was opened in 1989. The rink is run by the company "Galleria Buz Pateni Pisti", a subsidiary of the shopping mall.

The venue hosts all kinds of ice sports events in Istanbul including Turkish ice hockey leagues for men's, women's and junior's. It is home to the ice hockey club Istanbul Paten Kulübü.

By April 2010, the director general of the Galleria shopping mall announced that the ice rink will be closed to make space for additional recreational places and new stores within the renovation project of the shopping mall.

See also 
 Turkish Ice Hockey Super League

References 

Indoor arenas in Turkey
Ice hockey venues in Turkey
Sports venues completed in 1989
Sports venues in Istanbul
Sport in Bakırköy